Henry Godwin may refer to:
Henry Godwin (Army officer) (1784–1853), Major-General of the Bombay Army
Henry Haversham Godwin-Austen (1834–1923), English geologist
Henry O. Godwinn (born 1964), ring name of wrestler Mark Canterbury
Harry Godwin (1901–1985), botanist
Henry Thomas Godwin (1853–?), Ontario farmer and political figure

See also
Henry Goodwin (disambiguation)